Bojjannakonda and Lingalakonda are two Buddhism rock-cut caves on adjacent hillocks, situated near a village called Sankaram, Anakapalle of ancient Kalinga. in the Indian state of Andhra Pradesh. The sites are believed to date between 4th and 9th Century A.D, when Buddhism is the majority religion of Sankaram (Sangharam as it was called then). The original name of Bojjannakonda is Buddina Konda.

Brief history
Sankaram, a small village, is situated about a mile to the east of Anakapalli in the Anakapalle district of Andhra Pradesh. A short distance to the north of the village are two hills, the one on the east called Bojjannakonda and the other on the west called Lingalakonda, both of which are surrounded by paddy fields. The hills contain numerous monolithic stupas, rock-cut caves, chaityas and monasteries forming one of the most remarkable Buddhist establishments in Andhra Pradesh during the period from the 4th to the 9th Century CE. The name of the village Sankaram is evidently a corruption of Sangharam (Boudha-arama, i.e., vihara) as these Buddhist establishments are generally known.

Features

Bojjannakonda
This is the eastern hill. It is covered with a large group of monolithic stupas surrounding the rock-cut platforms of the Maha stupa
The dome of the stupa is found constructed of brick.

It was excavated under the ages of Alexander Rim in 1906. Interesting aspect of this site is it feature all three phases of Buddhism i.e. Hinayana, Mahayana and Vajrayana.

Groups of rock-cut and brick stupas and small chaityas surround this stupa. In two of the brick stupas, stone relic caskets in the form of miniature stupas were found. There is also a stone [Linga being the name locally applied to the stupa]. An image of the Goddess Hariti is found at the foot of the hill as per the archaeological sources.

On this hill there are six rock-cut caves of which some have sculptured panels. One main cave has sixteen pillars, or which five are broken, and it enshrines a monolithic stupa in the centre. There is a pradakshina-patha around it. On the ceiling over the stupa is a carving of a chhatra, i.e., umbrella which was originally connected with the top of the stupa, the shaft being now lost. Above this cave, is an upper storey with the figures of Buddha. In all, on this hill [Bojjannakonda], there are six rock-cut caves of which some have sculptured panels. Most panels consists of a seated Buddha and attendants.

'', is covered with a large number of rock-cut small stupas forming the shape of a ridge. Numerous antiquities were recovered during the excavations conducted by Mr. Alexander Rea in 1906

During Excavations From this area, as per the archaeological sources, pottery, seals, terracotta inscribed tablets, terracotta beads, and terracotta figures, one gold coin belonging to Samudra Gupta of the Gupta dynasty who ruled Magadha from 340 to 375 A.D, some copper coins belonging to the Eastern Chalukya king Vishnuvardhana surnamed Vishamasiddhi (633 A.D.) and only one lead coin were recovered. It has the impression of a horse and as such might belong to the later Satavahanas. It is on the evidence of these antiquities that it has been possible to date the Buddhist settlement here as lying between the 2nd and the 9th century A.D. For, among the earliest coins discovered at the site is that of Samudra Gupta of the 4th century AD.

As Buddhism began to spread, many centres of learning and viharas for the monks were set up in various regions. 
They can also be seen at Thotlakonda, Bavikonda, Pavurallakonda around Visakhapatnam. 
They all flourished around 3rd century BCE to 3rd century CE, but then gradually faded out, probably due to the revival of Hinduism.

Buddhist monks used to worship on the hill 2,000 years ago. It was originally known as Buddhuni konda (hill of the Buddha) but it came to be known as ‘Bojjannakonda' in course of time. Vaisakha Pournami is also celebrated on a large scale here at Bojjannakonda.

The Indian National Trust for Arts and Cultural Heritage, (INTACH), has already appealed to the authorities to ensure better protection of Buddhist sites by taking up the declaration of Bavikonda, Thotlakonda, Pavurallakonda and Bojjannakonda as heritage sites by UNESCO. This will not only pave the way for steady flow of funds, but also generate employment opportunities for the locals.

References

Archaeological sites in Andhra Pradesh
Stupas in India
Caves of Andhra Pradesh
Buddhist caves in India
Buddhist monasteries in India
Indian rock-cut architecture
Former populated places in India
Buddhist pilgrimage sites in India
Architecture in India
Caves containing pictograms in India
Tourist attractions in Andhra Pradesh
Buddhist sites in Andhra Pradesh